Anuja Ravindra Dhir, Lady Lavender KC (born 19 January 1968, Dundee, Scotland) is a British circuit judge. Dhir was the first non-white judge to be appointed to sit full-time at the Old Bailey.

Early life
Born at Dundee in 1968 of Indian heritage, Dhir was educated at Harris Academy before reading law at Dundee University, graduating with an LLB in 1988. She then won a Gray's Inn scholarship and was called to the Bar at Gray's Inn in 1989.

In 2018, Dhir received an honorary degree (Hon LLD) from Dundee University.

Career
Dhir practised as a barrister for 23 years, as counsel for both prosecution and defence, involved in serious criminal cases as well as cases involving national security and human rights.

Previously a member of various Bar Council Committees including the Equality Committee, the Professional Conduct Committee and Law Reform Committee, she has been heavily involved in advocacy training in the UK and abroad: she was head of teacher training for Gray's Inn and has led training in India, Sri Lanka, Jamaica (death row cases), Bermuda, Bhutan, Malaysia, Singapore (for the AG), Zimbabwe and South Africa.

Elected a Bencher of Gray's Inn in 2009, she took silk and was appointed Recorder in 2010, before promotion as a Circuit Judge in 2012. In February 2017, at the age of 49, she became a Judge at the Old Bailey. Since 2015, she has been a tutor judge at the Judicial College. In 2018, Dhir was authorised to sit in the Court of Appeal Criminal Division.

In November 2018 she made the headlines after sentencing an 18 year-old youth, who had threatened a motorist with a knife, already with a previous conviction for robbery with a knife, to a suspended sentence of imprisonment.

A Governor of the Hackney City Academy School since 2016, Dhir also serves as a Court Assistant of the Haberdashers' Company.

Personal life
She has been married since 2002 to Nicholas Lavender KC who was appointed a High Court Judge (QBD), and knighted, in 2016. They have two sons and a daughter.

References

External links
Lady Lavender becomes first non-white Circuit Judge at Old Bailey
Profile, judiciary.uk

1969 births
Living people
People from Dundee
British people of Indian descent
People educated at Harris Academy
Alumni of the University of Dundee
British barristers
21st-century English judges
British King's Counsel
Members of Gray's Inn
Wives of knights